Linksys manufactures a series of network routers. Many models are shipped with Linux-based firmware and can run third-party firmware. The first model to support third-party firmware was the very popular Linksys WRT54G series.

The Linksys WRT160N/WRT310N series is the successor to the WRT54G series of routers from Linksys. The main difference is the draft 802.11n wireless interface, providing a maximum speed of 270 Mbit/s over the wireless network when used with other 802.11n devices.

Specifications and versions

BEFW11S4 
Linksys' first series of wireless routers.

The Linksys BEFW11S4 is a Wi-Fi capable residential gateway from Linksys. The device is capable of sharing Internet connections among several computers via 802.3 Ethernet and 802.11b wireless data links. With only 1 MB of flash storage and 4 MB of RAM, no third party replacement firmware is compatible with it.

WRT54G series 

The Linksys WRT54G and variants WRT54GS, WRT54GL, and WRTSL54GS are Wi-Fi capable residential gateways from Linksys. The device is capable of sharing Internet connections among several computers via 802.3 Ethernet and 802.11b/g wireless data links.

The WRT54GL as well as most (but not all) of the other variants in this series, are capable of running Linux-based third-party firmware for added features. Supported software includes Tomato, OpenWrt, and DD-WRT

WRT100 
802.11g MIMO router with 100 Mbit/s switches

WRT110 
802.11g MIMO router with 100 Mbit/s switches

WRT120N 
150 Mbit/s N router, but not as fast as real N speeds, with 100 Mbit/s switches

WRT150N 
802.11n "draft" MIMO router with 100 Mbit/s switches.

WRT160N 
802.11n "draft" MIMO router with 100 Mbit/s switches. The E1000 and Cisco Valet M10 replaced this model.

WRT160NL 
802.11n "draft" MIMO router with 100 Mbit/s switches. Has a Linux-based OS, external antenna, and USB port for network storage. The E2100L replaced this model.

WRT300N 
802.11n "draft" MIMO router with 100 Mbit/s switches. Base model for all the others listed below.

WRT310N 
Similar to WRT350N with a Gigabit Ethernet switch, hardware crypto acceleration for IPSec, SSL, and WPA/WPA2. The WRT310N has an integrated wireless chipset rather than the external PC Card adapter found on the WRT350N. The Cisco Valet Plus M20 replaced this model.

WRT320N 
802.11n "draft" MIMO router with a gigabit switch and non-simultaneous dual-band. The E2000 replaced this model. Due to the hardware being very similar, it is possible to upgrade the WRT320N to an E2000 by replacing the CFE.

WRT330N 
Based on a different platform, but also has a Gigabit Ethernet switch according to the product specifications listed on the manufacturers website.

WRT350N 
Similar to WRT300N, but with a Gigabit Ethernet switch, hardware crypto acceleration for IPSec, SSL, and WPA/WPA2, and a USB 2.0 port for connecting a hard drive or flash-based USB storage devices directly to your network to share music, video, or data files.

WRT400N 
A simultaneous dual-band non-gigabit model.

WRT600N 
A simultaneous dual-band gigabit model. It looks like WRT350N including USB 2.0 storage link except that the WRT600N is black.

WRT610N 
A simultaneous dual-band gigabit model. The hardware is more integrated than the WRT600N and has no external antennas. The E3000 replaced this model.
A special system menu can be accessed by browsing to http://ip_address_of_wrt610n/System.asp.
″Vista Premium" (ability to turn off 6to4) and EGHN (Entertainment Grade Home Network = Linksys/Cisco UPnP QoS solution) can be configured in this page.

WRT1200AC 
The WRT1200AC is a dual band router inspired by its big brother the WRT1900AC.

WRT1900AC 
The WRT1900AC is a dual band router inspired by the original WRT54G iconic blue/black stackable form factor.

 The WRT1900AC router is advertised as "Open Source ready", and "Developed for use with OpenWRT." However, there did not exist any open source firmware for the WRT1900AC at the time the product was launched, although Linksys/Marvell recently released updated Wi-Fi drivers in 2015.... which has allowed OpenWRT to release new open source firmware images.

WRT1900ACS 
The WRT1900ACS was released 8. October 2015. It looks identical to the WRT1900AC, but has a 1.6 GHz dual core CPU (Same CPU as WRT1200AC/WRT1900AC v2, but overclocked to 1.6 GHz). Like the WRT1900AC v2, it has 512 MB of RAM.
In January 2016, DD-WRT became available for the WRT1900ACS, as well as both versions of the WRT1900AC.

WRT3200ACM 
This is a faster replacement of the WRT1900AC, but the 1900AC model can still be found. It has Tri-Stream 160 technology doubles bandwidth and the fastest dual-band of any router. MU-MIMO technology to multiple devices all at the same time, same speed. It is open-source ready with OpenWrt and DD-WRT®. Compatible with Linksys Smart Wi-Fi app to manage Wi-Fi from a mobile device. Specs refresh include a 256MB Flash and 512MB of RAM Memory.

WRT32X 3200ACM Gaming Router 
The WRT32X 3200ACM has identical hardware to the WRT3200ACM but includes the Rivet Networks Killer Prioritization Engine which identifies systems equipped with Killer Network LAN hardware. Powered by a dual-core 1.8 GHz CPU with 256MB of flash memory and 512MB of DDR3 memory it is capable of speeds of up to 600Mbit/s on 2.4 GHz band and 2600Mbit/s on the 5 GHz band.

E800 
A single-band non-gigabit model.

E900 
A single-band non-gigabit model.

E1000 
A single-band non-gigabit model that replaced the WRT160N. The E1000 v1 shares the same hardware as the Cisco Valet M10 v1.

E1200 
A single-band non-gigabit model.

E1500 
A single-band non-gigabit model.

E1550 
A single-band non-gigabit model with USB storage link.

E1700 
A single-band 4 port gigabit model.

E2000 
A non-simultaneous dual-band gigabit model that replaced the WRT320N.

E2100L 
A single-band non-gigabit model (with 2 external antennas and USB storage link) that replaced the WRT160NL.

E2500 
A simultaneous dual-band non-gigabit model.

E3000 
A simultaneous dual-band gigabit model that replaced the WRT610N. Similar to its predecessor, a special system menu can be accessed by browsing to http://ip_address_of_e3000/System.asp which displays a detailed system status page and allows administrators to disable/enable "Vista Premium" and the "Parental Control Status".

E3200 
A simultaneous dual-band gigabit model with USB storage link.

E4200 
A three-stream simultaneous dual-band gigabit model targeted for "high performance wireless entertainment", with a rated maximum throughput of 450 Mbit/s. This model also includes a USB port for storage, UPnP media streaming or a print server.

The E4200 also marks the first radical change in the design of the Linksys series since Cisco launched the winged "spaceship" design first seen on the WRT400N. The E4200 features a minimalistic, streamlined design with only a white status LED visible on the top. All traffic activity LEDs and buttons have been relocated to the rear of the device.

A special system menu can be accessed by browsing to http://ip_address_of_e4200/System.asp. This menu shows all kinds of system statistics and settings. No settings can be changed from this menu. This is only found in the original version, and not available in the v2 model.

The E4200V2 has a Marvell 88W8366/88W8063 wireless chipset.

In previous Tomato builds (a popular 3rd-party firmware for Linksys routers), only the 2.4 GHz radio was properly supported. However, simultaneous dual-band radio can now be achieved using Tomato RAF, Tomato Shibby and Tomato Toastman's builds.

EA2700 
A dual-band gigabit model. App enabled with Linksys Smart WiFi.

EA3500 
A dual-band gigabit model with USB storage link. App enabled with Linksys Smart WiFi.

EA4500 
A dual-band gigabit model with USB storage link. App enabled with Linksys Smart WiFi.

EA6100 
An 802.11ac dual-band model with USB storage link

EA6200 
An 802.11ac (advertised as AC900, actually AC1200) dual-band gigabit model with USB storage link. App enabled with Linksys Smart WiFi.

EA6300 
An 802.11ac (AC1200) dual-band gigabit model with USB storage link. App enabled with Linksys Smart WiFi.

EA6350 
An 802.11ac (AC1200) dual-band gigabit model with USB storage link. App enabled with Linksys Smart WiFi.

EA6400 
An 802.11ac (AC1600) dual-band gigabit model with USB storage link. App enabled with Linksys Smart WiFi.

EA6500 
An 802.11ac (AC1750) dual-band gigabit model with USB storage link. App enabled with Linksys Smart WiFi.

EA6700 
An 802.11ac (AC1750) dual-band gigabit model with USB storage link. App enabled with Linksys Smart WiFi.

EA6900 
An 802.11ac (AC1900) dual-band gigabit model with USB storage link. App enabled with Linksys Smart WiFi.

EA8300 
An 802.11ac (AC2200) MU-MIMO, tri-band, 'Max-Stream' gigabit model with USB 3.0 storage link. Browser-based setup or Linksys App.

E8350 
An 802.11ac (AC2400) dual-band MU-MIMO gigabit router.

EA8500 
An 802.11ac (AC2600) dual-band MU-MIMO gigabit router.

EA9200 
An 802.11ac (AC3200) tri-band MU-MIMO gigabit router.

See also 
 Cisco Valet Routers

References

External links 
 DD-WRT wiki page for Linksys WRT300N (v1.0)
 OpenWrt wiki page for Linksys WRT300N (v1.0 and v2.0)

Hardware routers
Linksys